The Song of Middle Earth is a book by author David Harvey, published in 1985.

Plot summary
The Song of Middle Earth is a book which contends that Tolkien's work is more original than critics say, and that Tolkien was creating a Mythology for England.

Reception
Dave Langford reviewed The Song of Middle Earth for White Dwarf #67, and stated that "This stodge should appeal to hobbits, who you'll remember 'liked to have books filled with things that they already knew, set out fair and square with no contradictions.'"

Reviews
Review by Chris Morgan and Pauline Morgan (1985) in Vector 127
Review by Brian Stableford (1985) in Fantasy Review, October 1985
Review by Mary Gentle (1985) in Interzone, #13 Autumn 1985

References

1985 non-fiction books
Books about Middle-earth